Barazin (also Romanized as Barāzīn) is a village in Ozomdel-e Shomali Rural District, in the Central District of Varzaqan County, East Azerbaijan Province, Iran. At the 2006 census, its population was 269, in 51 families.

References 

Towns and villages in Varzaqan County